In propositional logic, disjunction elimination (sometimes named proof by cases, case analysis, or or elimination), is the valid argument form and rule of inference that allows one to eliminate a disjunctive statement from a logical proof. The reasoning is simple: since at least one of the statements P and R is true, and since either of them would be sufficient to entail Q, Q is certainly true.

An example in English:
If I'm inside, I have my wallet on me.
If I'm outside, I have my wallet on me.
It is true that either I'm inside or I'm outside.
Therefore, I have my wallet on me.

It is the rule can be stated as:

where the rule is that whenever instances of "", and "" and "" appear on lines of a proof, "" can be placed on a subsequent line.

Formal notation 
The disjunction elimination rule may be written in sequent notation:

 

and expressed as a truth-functional tautology or theorem of propositional logic:

See also
 Disjunction
 Argument in the alternative
 Disjunct normal form

References

Rules of inference
Theorems in propositional logic